Harry Cornelius Graves (April 25, 1898 – January 3, 1966) was an American football and baseball coach. He served as the head football coach at Virginia Normal and Industrial Institute—now known as Virginia State University in 1923, and Wilberforce University in Wilberforce, Ohio from 1924 to 1933. His 1931 Wilberforce Green Wave football team was undefeated and recognized as a black college football national champion.

Graves played high school football in Pratt, Kansas and college football at Michigan Agricultural College—now known as Michigan State University. He succeeded Harry R. Jefferson at Wilberforce in 1924. He earned a master's degree from Ohio State University in 1933.

Graves died on January 3, 1966, at St. Mary's Hospital in Leonardtown, Maryland.

Head coaching record

Football

References

1898 births
1966 deaths
American football fullbacks
Michigan State Spartans football players
Virginia State Trojans athletic directors
Virginia State Trojans football coaches
Wilberforce Bulldogs football coaches
People from Pratt, Kansas
Coaches of American football from Kansas
Players of American football from Kansas
Baseball coaches from Kansas
Players of American football from Denver
African-American coaches of American football
African-American players of American football
African-American baseball coaches
African-American college athletic directors in the United States
20th-century African-American sportspeople